The Mahābhārata is a noted abridged translation of the Mahabharata by John D. Smith, first published in 2009 by Penguin Classics.

Quotations

Reviews

References

Further reading 
Doniger, Wendy (8 October 2009). How to Escape the Curse. London Review of Books. Vol. 31. No. 19. pages 17–18. Retrieved 4 October 2017.
Parihar, Parth (29 March 2016). No, Hinduism Is Not Behind India’s ‘Rape Crisis’. HuffPost. Retrieved 4 October 2017.

External links 
Book info at Penguin Group

2009 non-fiction books
Penguin Books books
Works based on the Mahabharata
Books about Kali (demon)